Tarzan's Peril is a 1951 film directed by Byron Haskin and starring Lex Barker as Tarzan and Virginia Huston as Jane, and featuring Dorothy Dandridge as "Melmendi, Queen of the Ashuba." Some of it was shot in Kenya, making it the first Tarzan film to be filmed in Africa, though the majority of its location shooting was done in the United States. Critics praised the convincing integration of the African and American footage. The film is frequently shown under the alternate titles Jungle Queen and Tarzan and the Jungle Queen.

Plot
District Commissioner Peters delays his retirement when confronted with Radijeck, an escaped criminal resuming his gunrunning on behalf on an unnamed foreign power. When Peters and his replacement Connors discover the gunrunning, Rajijeck murders the two men. Radijeck sells the weapons to King Bulam who arms his men to revenge himself against Melmendi, Queen of a rival tribe who spurns his offer of marriage.  With Melmendi and her people held captive, only Tarzan can stop them.

Cast

References

External links
 
 
 
 
 ERBzine Silver Screen: Tarzan's Peril

1951 films
1950s fantasy adventure films
American black-and-white films
American fantasy films
American sequel films
Films scored by Michel Michelet
Films shot in Kenya
Films shot in the United States
Peril
Films produced by Sol Lesser
RKO Pictures films
1950s English-language films
Films directed by Byron Haskin
1950s American films